Theodoros Stamos (Greek: Θεόδωρος Στάμος) (December 31, 1922 – February 2, 1997) was a Greek-American painter. He is one of the youngest painters of the original group of abstract expressionist painters (the so-called "Irascibles"), which included Jackson Pollock, Willem de Kooning and Mark Rothko. His later years were negatively affected by his involvement with the Rothko case.

Biography
Stamos was one of the original and youngest Abstract Expressionist artists working in New York City in the 1940s and 50s. He was born on Manhattan's Lower East Side to Greek immigrant parents; his mother was from Sparta, and his father was raised in Lefkada.  As a teenager, he won a scholarship to the American Artists School, where he studied sculpture with Simon Kennedy and Joseph Konzal. His instructor Joseph Solman, who was a member of the group The Ten, became a mentor to Stamos. At Solman's urging, Stamos visited Alfred Stieglitz's influential An American Place Gallery, where he encountered the work of Arthur Dove and Georgia O'Keeffe, among others.  During this period, the late 1930s and early 1940s, Stamos held a variety of odd jobs: printer, florist, hat-blocker, and book salesman.  Through one job, at Herbert Benevy's Gramercy Art frame shop on East 18th Street, he met members of the European avant-garde, including Arshile Gorky and Fernand Léger.

In 1943, when Stamos was 21 years old, prominent dealer Betty Parsons gave him a solo exhibition at her Wakefield Gallery and Bookshop.  Parsons became an important ally and connection to the contemporary New York art world; Stamos would show regularly with her until 1957.  By the mid-1940s, his career was becoming well established—he exhibited at the Whitney Museum annually from 1945 to 1951, at the Carnegie Institute and the Art Institute of Chicago in 1947, and at the Museum of Modern Art in 1948. Also during this period, Stamos’ work began attracting the attention of collectors. The Museum of Modern art purchased Stamos’ Sounds in the Rock in 1946.  And Edward Wales Root, who became both a supporter of Stamos’ career and a benefactor of the Munson-Williams-Proctor Institute, bought the first of many paintings from the artist in 1945.

The artist’s paintings from the 1940s combine muted earth-toned colors with biomorphic imagery, suggesting geologic shapes or inchoate organic forms. This dovetails with Stamos’ interest in natural history; as artist Barnett Newman observed in the introduction to Stamos’ 1947 exhibition with Betty Parsons Gallery, “His ideographs capture the moment of totemic affinity with the rock and the mushroom, the crayfish and the seaweed.  He re-defines the pastoral experience as one of participation with the inner life of the natural phenomenon.”

During the late 1940s he became a member of The Irascible Eighteen, a group of abstract painters who protested the Metropolitan Museum of Art's policy towards American painting of the 1940s and who posed for a famous picture in 1950; members of the group considered as the 'first generation' of abstract expressionists included: Willem de Kooning, Adolph Gottlieb, Ad Reinhardt, Hedda Sterne, Richard Pousette-Dart, William Baziotes, Jimmy Ernst, Jackson Pollock, James Brooks, Clyfford Still, Robert Motherwell, Bradley Walker Tomlin, Theodoros Stamos, Barnett Newman, and Mark Rothko. These artists are part of the New York School and they were referred to as The Irascibles in an article featured in an issue of Life where the infamous Nina Leen photograph  was published.

Around 1950, Stamos began exploring a new approach to abstraction.  Inspired by East Asian aesthetics, he created his Tea House series of paintings, characterized by softly defined geometric forms painted with a limited palette and often overlaid by dark calligraphic brushwork. Later in the 1950s, Stamos worked with compositions that became increasingly reductive and simplified.  He explored the use of layers of thin pigment, carefully worked, to create depth in his broad expanses of color.

Stamos traveled widely during much of his adult life.  In 1947, he traveled by train to New Mexico and the Pacific Northwest.  In 1948 and 49, he visited Europe, including parts of Greece, and possibly Egypt. For the next four decades, Stamos traveled widely and frequently. These trips both contributed to his aesthetic development and also provided fodder for his broad, deep intellectual interest in the world’s belief systems.  Beginning in 1962, he created several long series of paintings; many of these contained sub-series.  The Sun-Box series, begun in 1962, explored hard-edged geometries on flat grounds.  After 1971, all of his paintings were part of the Infinity Field series.  These abstractions are characterized by broad areas of color delineated by slim lines or shapes; the effect is subtle and meditative.  Among the Infinity Fields are the Lefkada sub-series, inspired by the Greek island where Stamos spent much of his time from 1970 until his death.

He taught at Black Mountain College from 1950 until 1954 and from 1955 to 1975 he taught at the Art Students League of New York and the Cummington School of Fine Arts. Stamos was also a member of the Uptown Group. A year before his death he donated 43 of his works to the National Gallery of Greece. He is buried in Lefkas, Greece.

Rothko Case

Mark Rothko chose his friend to be an executor of his estate, however this led to his involvement in the Rothko Case, a major lawsuit and scandal in the art world.

A little over a year after his suicide in 1970, Rothko's daughter sued the estate's executors, as well as the Marlborough Gallery, for waste and fraud.  Over twelve years of litigation and appeals, it was revealed that many of Rothko's paintings, which had been sold or consigned by his estate to the Marlborough Gallery in Manhattan, were sold at intentionally deflated prices to favored clients while the gallery collected inflated commissions as high as 50 percent, compared with the 30 percent usually charged for an artist of his caliber; the executors, meanwhile, divided the estate's proceeds from Marlborough as their fees. Stamos willingly joined the conspiracy, and was enticed to switch his representation from the André Emmerich Gallery by a more generous contract with the Marlborough. The defendants were found guilty and fined over $9 million; Stamos paid his share of the fine by signing over his house to the Rothko estate, but he was granted life tenancy.  While the case did much to enhance Rothko's reputation, it did serious damage to the reputation of both the gallery and Stamos.  Another perspective on the case was published in the New York Law Journal in 1988.

Stamos never recovered as an artist.  Galleries on the level of Emmerich or the pre-scandal Marlborough would not represent his work.  The lack of support from top galleries gave collectors a lesser sense of security regarding the value of his work and, possibly with general assessments of his work as an artist, caused his work to be perceived as low, second-tier or third-rank Abstract Expressionism by 1998.

Works
His Classic Boundaries I, an oil on canvas work from 1961 has been in the collection of the Art Institute of Chicago since 1962.  Its acquisition was funded by the Mary and Leigh Block Fund for Acquisitions. Iberian Sun Box from 1967 is included in the Governor Nelson A. Rockefeller Empire State Plaza Art Collection in Albany, NY.

See also
Abstract expressionism
Art Students League of New York
New York School
Black Mountain College

References

Sources
 Ralph Pomeroy, Stamos text by Ralph Pomeroy (New York, Abrams, (n.d.).) 
 Marika Herskovic, American Abstract Expressionism of the 1950s An Illustrated Survey, (New York School Press, 2003.) . p. 318-321
 Marika Herskovic, New York School Abstract Expressionists Artists Choice by Artists, (New York School Press, 2000.) . p. 18; p. 38; p. 346-349

Further reading
 Olds, Kirsten. (2008). Theodoros Stamos: Infinity and Beyond. New York: Hollis Taggart Galleries. .
 Mattison, Robert S. (2010). Theodoros Stamos: A Communion with Nature. New York: Hollis Taggart Galleries. .
 Groves, Jeffrey. (2017). Theodoros Stamos: Contemplations on the Universal. New York: Hollis Taggart Galleries. .

External links
NY Times obituary
 Phillips Collection bio
 Kouros Gallery images and Bio
 Stamos on Artnet
Stamos on Artnet magazine
MoMA exhibition, 2010-2011, Wall Street Journal
Hollis Taggart Galleries | Images and Biography

20th-century American painters
American male painters
Modern painters
American contemporary painters
Abstract expressionist artists
Art Students League of New York faculty
1922 births
1997 deaths
Greek painters
Greek contemporary artists
American people of Greek descent
Painters from New York City
20th-century American male artists